Hessley James Hempstead II (January 29, 1972 – June 11, 2021) was an American professional football player who was an offensive lineman in the National Football League (NFL). He played for the Detroit Lions. He played college football for the Kansas Jayhawks. After the end of his playing career, Hessley worked as a scout for the Lions in 2000 and the Washington Redskins in 2001. Hessley Hempstead died after suffering a heart attack on June 11, 2021.

References

1972 births
2021 deaths
American football offensive linemen
Place of death missing
People from Upland, California
Players of American football from California
Sportspeople from San Bernardino County, California
Detroit Lions players
Kansas Jayhawks football players